Swami Omvesh is an Indian politician from Samajwadi Party. He is elected to the Uttar Pradesh Legislative Assembly from Chandpur constituency of Uttar Pradesh in 2022 in Uttar Pradesh assembly election, and was also elected in the 1996 and 2002 Uttar Pradesh Legislative Assembly election as a member of the Rashtriya Lok Dal.

References

Living people
Samajwadi Party politicians
Rashtriya Lok Dal politicians
People from Bijnor district
Uttar Pradesh MLAs 1997–2002
Uttar Pradesh MLAs 2002–2007
Uttar Pradesh MLAs 2022–2027
Year of birth missing (living people)